The Port Fairy Gazette was an English language newspaper published in Port Fairy, Victoria, Australia.

History 
The Port Fairy Gazette was owned by Henry James Richmond from the mid 1890s, and by Edward Hanley from 1908 to 1934. His sons Vincent and Frank took over publication in the 1930s, and their brother Hugh later became editor.

During its publication history, the title of the newspaper alternated between the Port Fairy Gazette and the Gazette. It also absorbed a number of smaller newspapers including the Port Fairy Times & Macarthur news and the Port Fairy News.

The Gazette ceased publication in 1989.

Digitisation 
The paper has been digitised as part of the Australian Newspapers Digitisation Program of the National Library of Australia.

See also
List of newspapers in Australia

References

External links 

Defunct newspapers published in Victoria (Australia)
1989 disestablishments in Australia